Never Mind the Sex Pistols, Here's the Tribute is a tribute album to the punk rock band the Sex Pistols.

Track listing

References

Punk rock compilation albums